The Castle of Stilo or  Norman Castle is a castle of the Norman period built at Stilo, Calabria in southern Italy by Roger I of Sicily upon Monte Consolino in the 11th century.

History 
The first reference to the Norman castle at Stilo is from May 7, 1093 in a concession act of the Great Count to Saint Bruno: "elegerunt itaque quondam solitudinis locum inter locum qui dicitur Arena et oppidum quod appelatur Stilum".

In the 13th century, it was one of the seventeen castles in Calabria managed by Reale Curia during the reign of Charles I of Naples and it was also used as a prison. In that period, it was subjected to maintenance as written in folio 233 of 1281 of Regia Zecca Archive.

In the registry of April 14, 1323, it was written that Duke of Calabria, son of King Robert give to Noble, Contestabile, Baron of Settingiano Marco the "Castellania of Stilo" (ruling the Castle of Stilo) to him and his descents.

Since 2009 the castle has been under restoration.

Paths 

The castle is reachable by two main paths: from the panoramic and high slope path that start near Cattolica church, and following the Stilo's Via Crucis path composed by fourteen steps and three rest and panoramic area with benches, the second much larger and less sloped starts near Stilo Cemetery.

Legends about Norman Castle 
The Norman castle is haunted by a ghostly drumming sound. It has been said that centuries ago, a drummer boy was sent through the castle cellar to follow a secret passage, while beating on his drum so others could follow the sound. But at the half-point, the drumming suddenly stopped and the drummer boy mysteriously vanished without a trace.

See also 

Stilo
Monte Consolino

References

External links 
handwriting of Castle of Stilo by Francesco Corni (Bellitalia magazine - 1986)

Castles in Calabria
Vallata dello Stilaro
Stilo